The Quinocho Memorial Trophy is an annual pre-season football competition hosted by Celta Vigo. It is dedicated to their former player and club director Joaquín Fernández Santomé "Quinocho".

Winners

References

Spanish football friendly trophies
RC Celta de Vigo
1995 establishments in Spain